The Embassy of Ukraine in Austria is a diplomatic mission of Ukraine in Austria, in Vienna.

Functions of the embassy 

The main functions of the embassy of Ukraine in Vienna are to represent the interests of Ukraine, promote the development of political, economic, cultural, scientific and other relations as well as to protect the rights and interests of citizens and legal entities of Ukraine located in Austria. The embassy promotes the development of good neighborly relations between Ukraine and the Republic of Austria at all levels to ensure the harmonious development of mutual relations and cooperation on issues of mutual interest. The embassy also performs consular functions.

History of diplomatic relations 

Since 1918 the interests of the Ukrainian People's Republic (UPR) in Austria were represented by A. Yakovliv, V. Lypynskyi, and G. Sydorenko.

Among the employees of the embassy were a well-known public and political figure Andrii Zhuk (counselor), an art critic Volodymyr Zalozetskyi-Sas (government official), a journalist Mykola Trotskyi (secretary, head of the consular department), a lawyer I. Khrapko (legal adviser), V. Trokhymovych (head of the office, head of the economic department), Volodymyr Poletyka (advisor), Volodymyr Semeniv (attache), Horobets, Khomenko (government officials), Bilits, Viacheslav Lypynskyi's personal secretary and friend Mykhailo Tsypriianovych, Mykhailo Bilenkyi (first secretary, treasurer), Bondarenko , Krushelnytskyi, Haievskyi, Khrapko (typist), Stanislav Vankovych (attache), General Viacheslav Levytskyi (military attache, did not take the office), Captain Volodyslav Dashkevych-Horbatskyi (naval attache). The structure of the embassy had 4 departments (consular, passport, press, economic) and the office.

During June 1918 and February 1919, the press department of the embassy was headed by Councilor Ivan Tokarzhevskyi-Karashevych. In 1919–1920 The Ukrainian Press Office in Vienna was headed by O. Kushchak.

On 26 September 1991, in New York City, the Ministers of Foreign Affairs of Ukraine Anatolii Zlenko and Alois Mok signed the Protocol on Consular Relations. On 24 January 1992, diplomatic relations were established between the two states. The Austrian Consulate in Kyiv was transformed into an Embassy. On 3 April 1992, the Embassy of Ukraine in the Republic of Austria began its work in Vienna. Austria is the only country that has not formalized the diplomatic recognition of Ukraine as it believes the fact of Ukraine's membership in the UN and in several international specialized organizations indicates the recognition of Ukraine by the world community in 1945.

Heads of diplomatic missions

Comparison between the two nations

See also
 Austria–Ukraine relations
 List of diplomatic missions in Austria
 Foreign relations of Austria
 Foreign relations of Ukraine
 Ukraine–EU relations
 Ukrainians in Austria
 Austrians in Ukraine

References 

 

Austria–Ukraine relations
Ukraine
Austria